The 1909 Auburn Tigers football team was an American football team that represented Alabama Polytechnic Institute (now known As Auburn University) as a member of the Southern Intercollegiate Athletic Association (SIAA) during the 1909 college football season. In their fifth year under head coach Mike Donahue, the team compiled an overall record of 5–2, with a mark of 4–2 in conference play, placing sixth in the SIAA.

Schedule

References

Auburn
Auburn Tigers football seasons
Auburn Tigers football